Proncojapyx is a genus of diplurans in the family Japygidae.

Species
 Proncojapyx scotti Silvestri, 1948

References

Diplura